Timo Suviranta (9 June 1930 – 21 January 1994) was a Finnish basketball player. He competed in the men's tournament at the 1952 Summer Olympics.

References

1930 births
1994 deaths
Finnish men's basketball players
Olympic basketball players of Finland
Basketball players at the 1952 Summer Olympics
Sportspeople from Helsinki